The Basilica of Our Lady of Lanka (Sinhala: ලංකා අප ස්වාමිදුවගේ බැසිලිකාව Lanka Apa Swamiduwagay Bæsilikawa/ Tamil: லங்கா மாதா பேராலயம் lanka matha peralayam) is a Roman Catholic basilica in Tewatte, Sri Lanka. Being thus in a somewhat distant suburb of Colombo, it comes under the purview of the Roman Catholic Archdiocese of Colombo and is a site of pilgrimage for Sri Lankan Catholics. The church is home to the venerated statue of Our Lady of Lanka.

History

Our Lady of Lanka started its life in 1911 as a small chapel dedicated to Our Lady of Lourdes (Mary Immaculate), France. It was built by a local pastor Fr. A. Kieger and a few Catholic laymen, as a part of the parish of Ragama at that time. In 1917 another pastor, Fr. A. Collorec had a grotto built for Our Lady of Lourdes, with the assistance of Catholic workers from Colombo. The growing popularity of the chapel led to the chapel being expanded into a church in the 1930s.

However, its true rise to fame occurred due to the former Archbishop of Colombo, Jean-Marie Masson. During the outbreak of the Second World War, Archbishop Masson made a vowed that if Ceylon were to be protected from major conflict, he would build a Votive Basilica under the title Our Lady of Lanka. Ceylon was indeed spared from any major warfare. The archbishop was delighted and in 1946 he obtained approval from the then Pope, Pius XII, for the construction of a basilica in honor of Our Lady of Lanka.

Masson died the following year and his successor Archbishop Thomas Cooray took on the responsibility of ensuring his predecessor's vision was realized; In 1948 the Pope Pius XII established the Mary Immaculate, to be known as Our Lady of Lanka, as the principal Roman Catholic patroness of the island. He then acquired a nearby rubber estate and had the basilica constructed on the amply sized land. Many shady local trees such as Neem and Na were planted to give a place for future pilgrims to rest under.

On February 4, 1950, the cornerstone for the basilica was laid. It was completed in 1974, a year after Pope Paul VI endowed the church with the title of Minor Basilica. On February 6, 1974, the consecration of the basilica and crowning of the statue of Our Lady of Lanka took place; making it the national basilica and a national shrine of Sri Lanka.

References

Roman Catholic churches in Sri Lanka
Basilica churches in Asia
Roman Catholic churches completed in 1974
Churches in Colombo District
Roman Catholic shrines in Sri Lanka
20th-century Roman Catholic church buildings in Sri Lanka